RCG may refer to:

 Radio Crne Gore, a radio station in Montenegro
 Republic of Montenegro, state preceding independent Montenegro
 The Radio Church of God, now the Worldwide Church of God
 Range Concatenation Grammar, a type of formal grammar
 Restored Church of God
 Revolutionary Communist Group (disambiguation), several political parties
 Royal Cambodian Government
 Phalaris arundinacea (reed canary grass), a species of grass